Natrona is an unincorporated community in Harrison Township, Allegheny County in the U.S. state of Pennsylvania. Natrona is situated along the Allegheny River at Lock and Dam Four, Pools Three and Four between Brackenridge, Natrona Heights, Karns, Allegheny Township, and Lower Burrell.

History

The original village of Natrona – then known as East Tarentum – was built as a company town by the Pennsylvania Salt Manufacturing Company in the 1850s.  The company began with two salt wells in 1850, and continued operations until 1959.  By 1876, the company, which owned the cryolite deposits of Greenland, brought the crude mineral to its works in Natrona, where the mineral was pulverized, sifted, heated, reacted with calcium carbonate and leached to produce pure carbonate of soda (sodium carbonate) and aluminate of soda (sodium aluminate).

Canal

The Pennsylvania Canal once passed through Natrona and nearby communities in the early- to mid-19th century.

Railroads

The Pennsylvania Railroad had a train station in Natrona at Vine and Federal streets; its rail line began running through the town in the mid-19th century. Later, the Pennsylvania Railroad merged with rival New York Central Railroad in 1968 to form the Penn Central Transportation Company. The Interstate Commerce Commission required that the ailing New York, New Haven and Hartford Railroad be added in 1969. The Consolidated Rail Corporation replaced the Penn Central Transportation Company and operated freight service through Natrona from 1976 until 1999 when it was divided between two companies. The Norfolk Southern Railway then operated trains through the town. Amtrak has detoured passenger service through Natrona on occasion; its nearest station is Penn Station in Downtown Pittsburgh.

The West Penn Railways provided electric street car service to Natrona from 1906 until 1937.

Local factories, beginning with the Pennsylvania Salt Manufacturing Company's Natrona Works, also operated trains through Natrona. As of 2011, Allegheny Technologies used a track to transport materials between departments at its Allegheny Ludlum Brackenridge Works.

Mining
The Pennsylvania Salt Manufacturing Company operated its Natrona No. 1 and Natrona No. 2 bituminous coal mines at Natrona.

Geography
Natrona is situated on an alluvial floodplain along the Allegheny River.

Education
The community is located within the Highlands School District. Highlands High School and Highlands Middle School are located in Natrona Heights. Air pollution levels (particularly chromium) measured in Natrona area schools are among the worst in the United States.

Usage in popular culture

Knightriders
The film Knightriders (1981) by George A. Romero starring Ed Harris used scenes shot on Garfield Street in Natrona (1980) for the movie. Most of the film was shot in nearby Fawn Township.

Striking Distance

Also, the film Striking Distance (1993) starring Bruce Willis and Sarah Jessica Parker uses a sequence where boats jump over the dam at Natrona; the Tarentum Bridge can be seen just above the dam over Jacks Island, although the structure was added there later through editing.

Notable people
 Leon Czolgosz, the assassin of U.S. President William McKinley in 1901, spent part of his teenage years working at a glass factory located in the town.
 Evelyn Nesbit, American artists' model, chorus girl, and actress. She is best known for her years as a young woman in New York City, particularly her involvement in a deadly love triangle between railroad scion Harry Kendall Thaw and architect Stanford White.

See also

 Environmentalism – Natrona has a United States Environmental Protection Agency Superfund site
 Samuel Kier operated salt and oil wells in the 19th century at Natrona.
 National Register of Historic Places listings in Allegheny County, Pennsylvania
 Natrona Bottling Company – a local manufacturer of soft drink beverages
 Rachel Carson lived in nearby Springdale during her youth.

References

External links
Natrona Comes Together Association
Community Revitalization Plan for Natrona

Pittsburgh metropolitan area
Company towns in Pennsylvania
Unincorporated communities in Allegheny County, Pennsylvania
Unincorporated communities in Pennsylvania